Francina or Francena is a common feminine given name as well as a surname. Notable people with the name include

Given name Francina
Francina Armengol (born 1971), Spanish politician
Francina Elsje Blankers-Koen (1918 – 2004), Dutch track and field athlete known as Fanny Blankers-Koen
Francina Broese Gunningh (1783 - 1824), Dutch soldier
Francina Díaz Mestre, Spanish model
Francina Margaretha van Huysum (1707 – 1789), Dutch painter
Francina Pubill (born 1960), Spanish footballer
Francina Sorabji (1833 — 1910), Indian educator

Given name Francena
Francena McCorory (born 1988), American athlete
Francena H. Arnold (1888–1972), American novelist

Last name
Marc Francina (1948 – 2018), French politician

See also

Francine
Francinaina Cirer Carbonell (1781 – 1855), Spanish religious figure